Taiwanese Canadians are Canadian citizens who carry full or partial ancestry from the East Asian island country of Taiwan or from preceding Taiwanese regimes (Qing Taiwan, Japanese Taiwan, etc.). This includes Canadian-born Taiwanese (CBT).

There are over one hundred thousand Taiwanese who have gained citizenship or permanent residency status in Canada.

Immigration
Taiwanese people have been present in Canada since the 1970s but many of those immigrants have since moved to the United States and have become part of the Taiwanese American and Chinese American communities. Starting from the late 1980s, many Taiwanese people immigrated to Canada, especially Vancouver, British Columbia, and to the adjacent cities of Burnaby, Richmond, and Coquitlam to form a permanent Taiwanese Canadian community. The Greater Vancouver metropolitan area now has the largest Taiwanese community in Canada. There is also an established Taiwanese community in Toronto, but more spread out than its counterpart in Vancouver. Unlike the Taiwanese American community with a longer history in North America, the majority of the younger Taiwanese Canadians are either first generation or 1.5 generation immigrants who have either grown up entirely in Taiwan or have completed at least some elementary or junior high school education in Taiwan prior to immigrating to Canada. This is because many Taiwanese Canadian households are made up of households where the providers are people retired from their businesses and occupations in Taiwan, and decided to move their families (many with adolescent or grown-up children) to Canada. There are also many Taiwanese Canadian households where the primary provider (usually the father) is not retired and still conducts business in Taiwan which requires frequent travel between Taiwan and Canada and maybe even require living away from their families for part of the year or longer (this situation is typical of many of the Hong Kong Chinese as well). There is a sizable Waisheng Taiwanese community as well in Vancouver that may rival the Bensheng community in size, but they tend to identify themselves more as Chinese Canadians.

Languages
First-generation or 1.5-generation Taiwanese Canadians (especially Bensheng Taiwanese) are often fluent in both Mandarin as well as Hokkien. To a lesser extent, Hakka is also spoken by those of Taiwanese Hakka heritage. Among the second generation, English often becomes their preferred language and linguistic fluency in the heritage language varies. Thus, many second-generation Taiwanese Canadians either speak Taiwanese as their heritage language and may not know any Mandarin or speak Mandarin as their heritage language and know little Taiwanese (the latter is particularly common among families from the Taipei Metropolitan Area). Maintaining their heritage language depends on the efforts of their parents and whether the individuals are exposed to Mandarin through Mandarin Chinese schools. Second-generation Taiwanese of Hakka descent tend to speak better Mandarin as their heritage language. According to the 2011 census, 9,635 reported to speak Taiwanese as their mother tongue.

Settlement in Vancouver
Many Taiwanese immigrants have recently (as of 2011) settled in Vancouver, B.C., forming a growing and stable Taiwanese Canadian community; however, it is often overlooked due to the presence of a larger Hong Kong Chinese immigrant base. Many of these immigrants from Taiwan, especially those without family or relatives in United States, find it easier to immigrate to Canada. These Taiwanese immigrants are also relatively wealthy and like many of the Hong Kong Chinese can afford Vancouver's high cost of living. The Greater Vancouver metropolitan area offers comfortable living and the conveniences of modern Chinese shopping centers with a vast array of restaurants, eateries, and grocery stores that provide the foods and entertainment that reflect the modern trends that the Hong Kong Chinese and Taiwanese were accustomed to prior to arriving in Canada. Because Vancouver has more Hong Kong Chinese than Taiwanese, the fashions and products available largely reflect the modern trends of Hong Kong more so than Taiwan. This is in contrast to the Santa Clara Valley/Silicon Valley and San Gabriel Valley in California where there are concentrated communities with larger proportions of people of Taiwanese heritage and where many Chinese shopping centers, restaurants, supermarkets, and other retail businesses tend to reflect more of the modern Taiwanese trends. There are T & T Supermarkets in Canada as opposed to 99 Ranch Markets in the United States.

Taiwanese American visitors, south of the Canada–United States border
Greater Vancouver also attracts Taiwanese American visitors from the Greater Seattle Area in the United States (approximately 200 km south of the Canada–US border). Vancouver is the only large Canadian city that is close in proximity to another large city just south of the Canada–US border and where both cities have well-established Chinese and Taiwanese communities.

The Greater Seattle Area overall has a larger and longer established Taiwanese population than Vancouver, but its Taiwanese residents are spread out over a vast area and not as highly concentrated in one area as those in Vancouver. The few "Chinese" shopping center complexes in Seattle's International District (Chinatown) may be owned by Taiwanese and/or Chinese people but cater mostly to other Asians such as first-generation Southeast Asians of Vietnamese and Cambodian heritage. Shops particularly in the heart of the International District are owned by older-established Cantonese/Toisan Chinese Americans (the descendants of the first Chinese who built up most of the Chinatowns in many American cities). Seattle is much closer to Vancouver than to San Francisco, San Jose, and Los Angeles (all located in California with large Chinese and Taiwanese communities).

The Greater Vancouver area has amenities for Taiwanese and Chinese communities quite similar to these large California metropolitan areas. Despite the long wait times at the Canada–United States border customs, it is still worth a road trip up to Vancouver for food and commercial products (i.e., music CDs, books, snack items) from Taiwan and Hong Kong. Many Taiwanese Americans from the Greater Seattle Area and other Asian American hubs also have business and social connections and family ties to the Taiwanese Canadian families in Vancouver. University and college students of Chinese and Taiwanese heritage (primarily from the University of Washington's Seattle campus) make frequent road trips to Vancouver.

Notable Taiwanese Canadians (including those currently not residing in Canada)
 Tsai Ah-hsin (蔡阿信), first female Taiwanese physician, one of few immigrants emigrated in Japanese colonial period
 Angela Chang (張韶涵), singer and actress in Taiwan
 Brandon Chang (張卓楠), artist in Taiwan and Hong Kong
 Terry Chen, film and television actor
 Jacky Chu (祝釩剛), actor and the lead singer of Taiwanese group 183 Club
 Godfrey Gao, model and actor
 Ed Hill, award-winning stand-up comedian
 Christine Kuo (苟芸慧), actress based in Hong Kong
 Cindy Lee, founder of the T & T Supermarket chain
 Chungsen Leung (梁中心), businessman and federal MP for Willowdale
 Chase Tang (唐嘉壕), Taiwanese-Canadian actor, model and mental health advocate
 Joseph Tsai, vice chairman of Alibaba Group
 Paul Tseng, Taiwan-born American and Canadian applied mathematician
 Jason Wu (吳季剛), fashion designer based in Manhattan, New York City
 Eddie Yuyan Peng (彭于晏), actor and singer in Taiwan
 Jeremy Wang, Twitch streamer and YouTube personality
 Demos Yu-bou Chiang, Taiwanese Canadian designer and businessman
Mark Chao(趙又廷), Taiwanese-Canadian actor, model
 Emilio Estevez(蔡立靖), soccer player for Ado Den Haag and Taiwan

See also

 Fo Guang Shan Temple, Toronto
 Ling Yen Mountain Temple
 Taiwanese people
 Taiwanese identity
 Taiwanese cuisine
 Taiwanese Americans
 Asian Canadians
 Taiwanese Canadian Association of Toronto
 East Asian Canadians

References

External links
 Taiwanese Canadian Association (加拿大臺灣同鄉會)
 Taiwanese Canadian Association of Toronto (多倫多臺灣同鄉會)
 Taiwanese Canadian Community Network - Taiwanese in Toronto (多倫多台灣人論壇/加拿大台灣人社區聯網 - 多倫多)
 Taiwanese Canadian Cultural Society (臺加文化協會)

 
Asian Canadian
 
East Asian Canadian